Ng Wai Chiu (born 22 October 1981 in Hong Kong) is a Hong Kong former professional footballer. He was capped for Hong Kong at various youth levels, as well as the senior national team. He is currently the assistant manager of Chinese Super League club Dalian Professional.

Early life
Ng Wai Chiu's father Ng Chi Ying was also a footballer for Guangdong. At the age of 7, Ng Wai Chiu moved from Kowloon Bay to Shatin's Hin Keng Estate. He then started playing football in the football field below his building. He began to challenge his father's football skills when he was 15 but lost every time. He joined the Hong Kong Sports Institute in the same year and met his Hong Kong defence partner Chan Wai Ho there for the first time.

Club career
Ng spent time learning his trade at various clubs, including a short spell in England when he was an apprentice with Huddersfield Town and Southampton side.

Unsatisfied with the Hong Kong League, Ng moved to Mainland to further develop his football ability. After gradually working his way up from the lower-divisions in Mainland, he signed for Nanjing Yoyo in the Chinese Jia League on 15 February 2004, before moving to Shanghai Zobon in the Chinese Super League in 2005.

Shanghai Zobon
In 2005, Ng Wai Chiu was a regular starter for newly promoted club Shanghai Zobon under coach Ma Liangxing. He played 23 matches for Zobon and scored 1 goal. The club finished 11th in the 14 team league. He was named as a member of the Shanghai United team to face Primera Liga outfits Villareal CF and Sevilla.

Shanghai Shenhua
Near the end of the 2006 Chinese Super League season, Ng Wai Chiu was selected as a member of the CSL All Stars. With Ng and Li Wei Feng in central defence, Shenhua only conceded 18 goals, the second best record in the league. On 21 December, the club and the player announced an extension to their contract.

Hangzhou Greentown
Ng played for the Chinese Super League club Hangzhou Greentown, and is the first professional player from Hong Kong to be in the Chinese Super League.

In the 2010–11 season, he was plagued by injuries to his knee and missed many matches with Hangzhou Greentown as well as the Hong Kong national football team.

South China
Ng Wai Chiu return to Hong Kong and joined South China on 22 January 2011. But his knee injury persisted and he did not play until April. On 16 April, he played 13 minutes as a substitute as South China beat Rangers (HKG) 3:1.

On 3 May, in the 2011 AFC Cup, Ng Wai-Chiu came on as a substitute in the away game against Persipura Jayapura and scored with a header with 4 minutes remaining. But it was to no avail as South China lost 4:2 and was dumped out of the tournament.

Pegasus
Ng Wai Chiu joined TSW Pegasus in January 2012 to get more playing opportunities. He made his debut on 4 February 2012 at home against Sham Shui Po and scored a goal to help his new club seal a 3–0 victory.

Tianjin Songjiang
Ng Wai Chiu joined Tianjin Songjiang for an undisclosed fee on 25 December 2012. He was the captain of Tianjin Songjiang in the 2012–13 season.

Eastern
Ng played his final two seasons at Eastern. He announced his retirement from playing on 19 June 2018 in order to transition to coaching.

International career

Hong Kong
Ng Wai Chiu played for Hong Kong against Japan in the 2011 AFC Asian Cup qualification match in Hong Kong, but Hong Kong lost 0:4.

Ng Wai Chiu also played in the 2010 East Asian Football Championship where Hong Kong lost all 3 of its matches and finished last.

Ng Wai Chiu was optimistic he would be able to play for Hong Kong in the 2014 FIFA World Cup Asian qualification matches. But in the end he missed the 2014 FIFA World Cup Asian qualification matches against Saudi Arabia due to his poor form.

On 30 September 2011, Ng Wai-Chiu was sent off in the 3:3 draw with the Philippines in the 2011 Long Teng Cup.

On 1 January 2012, Ng Wai-Chiu captained Hong Kong to victory over Guangdong in the 2012 Guangdong-Hong Kong Cup when Hong Kong won the cup on penalties.

On 18 September 2012, Ng decided to quit international football.

Personal life
Ng Wai Chiu's uncle is Hong Kong actor Francis Ng. Francis Ng wrote the foreword for Ng Wai Chiu's autobiography Winning Over Myself (贏自己).

Career statistics

International

Honours

Club
Tianjin Quanjian
China League One: 2016

Notes

References

External links

BMA Football Star 

1981 births
Living people
Hong Kong footballers
Hong Kong international footballers
Double Flower FA players
Hong Kong First Division League players
Hong Kong Premier League players
Chinese Super League players
China League One players
Expatriate footballers in China
Shanghai Shenhua F.C. players
Guangzhou F.C. players
Zhejiang Professional F.C. players
Nanjing Yoyo players
Kitchee SC players
South China AA players
TSW Pegasus FC players
Tianjin Tianhai F.C. players
Eastern Sports Club footballers
Hong Kong expatriate sportspeople in China
Footballers at the 2002 Asian Games
Association football central defenders
Association football midfielders
Hong Kong expatriate footballers
Asian Games competitors for Hong Kong
Hong Kong League XI representative players